The 2005 UEFA Intertoto Cup finals were won by Lens, Marseille, and Hamburg. All three teams advanced to the UEFA Cup.

First round

First leg

Second leg

Beitar Jerusalem won 6–4 on aggregate.

Gent won 3–2 on aggregate.

Pogoń Szczecin won 9–2 on aggregate.

Budućnost Podgorica won 7–2 on aggregate.

Lokeren won 2–1 on aggregate.

Göteborg won 5–2 on aggregate.

Varteks won 5–3 on aggregate.

Slaven Belupo won 2–0 on aggregate.

Neuchâtel Xamax won 9–1 on aggregate.

CFR Ecomax Cluj won 7–3 on aggregate.

Gloria Bistrița won 16–0 on aggregate.

Tampere United won 3–0 on aggregate.

ZTS Dubnica won 2–0 on aggregate.

Žalgiris won 2–0 on aggregate.

Lech Poznań won 4–1 on aggregate.

Sturm Graz won 6–1 on aggregate.

Dinaburg won 4–1 on aggregate.

Pobeda won 3–1 on aggregate.

Tescoma Zlín won 1–0 on aggregate.

Lombard-Pápa won 3–1 on aggregate.

Inter Turku won 4–0 on aggregate.

Second round

First leg

Second leg

Sigma Olomouc won 1–0 on aggregate.

1–1 on aggregate, CFR Ecomax Cluj won in a penalty shootout.

Wolfsburg won 5–3 on aggregate.

Deportivo La Coruña won 4–2 on aggregate.

ZTS Dubnica won 4–1 on aggregate.

Slovan Liberec won 7–2 on aggregate.

Saint-Étienne won 3–2 on aggregate.

Gent won 1–0 on aggregate.

Hamburg won 8–2 on aggregate.

Slaven Belupo won 4–2 on aggregate.

Young Boys won 6–2 on aggregate.

Varteks won 6–5 on aggregate.

Tampere United won 1–0 on aggregate.

Göteborg won 4–2 on aggregate.

Žalgiris won 3–2 on aggregate.

Lens won 3–1 on aggregate.

Third round

First leg

Second leg

Deportivo La Coruña won 4–0 on aggregate.

Žalgiris won 5–4 on aggregate.

1–1 on aggregate, Sigma Olomouc won on away goals rule.

Marseille won 5–3 on aggregate.

Lens won 5–2 on aggregate.

1–1 on aggregate, Roda won on away goals rule.

Hamburg won 3–0 on aggregate.

Valencia won 2–0 on aggregate.

Newcastle United won 5–1 on aggregate.

Lazio won 4–1 on aggregate.

Wolfsburg won 4–0 on aggregate.

3–3 on aggregate, CFR Ecomax Cluj won on away goals rule.

Semi–finals

First leg

Second leg

CFR Ecomax Cluj won 7–2 on aggregate.

Lens won 4–0 on aggregate.

Valencia won 4–0 on aggregate.

Hamburg won 4–0 on aggregate.

Deportivo La Coruña won 4–2 on aggregate.

Marseille won 4–1 on aggregate.

Finals

First leg

Second leg

Lens won 4–2 on aggregate.

Marseille won 5–3 on aggregate.

Hamburg won 1–0 on aggregate.

See also
2005–06 UEFA Champions League
2005–06 UEFA Cup

References

External links

Official site
Results at RSSSF

UEFA Intertoto Cup
3